Suchanino is a district of Gdańsk, Poland, located in the central part of the city. 
With 12,937 inhabitants in an area of 1.3 km2 it has a population density of 9,812 inhabitants/km2. Most buildings are high-rise and were constructed in the 1970s.

During World War II, the Germans established and operated a subcamp of the Stutthof concentration camp in the district. The prisoners were subjected to forced labour at a local brickyard.

References

External links
 Map of Suchanino
 Old map of Zigankenberg
 http://www.zeno.org/Meyers-1905/A/Zigankenberg
 http://www.xs4all.nl/~wolfzim/origine.html

Districts of Gdańsk